or  (Latin for "On banquets of barbarians" or "On barbarian guests") is an epigram preserved in the  (Paris, Bibliothèque Nationale de France, Codex Parisinus Latinus, 10318) of the Latin Anthology, copied in Italy  800 AD. It is noted for containing a few words in a Germanic language that historians believe to be Gothic or Vandalic: in either case, this makes it a rare attestation of medieval East Germanic.

Origins and language
The poem's date of composition is unknown, but postulated to be penned between the sixth and eighth century AD.  Although the text states that it is referring to Goths per se, several features mark the Germanic words as Vandalic, and it is likely that the text simply uses the term 'Gothic' loosely: correspondingly, Procopius refers to the Goths, Vandals, Visigoths, and Gepids as "Gothic nations" and opines that they "are all of the Arian faith, and have one language called Gothic".

Text
Translation of the Germanic words in the epigram is disputed, but the text means something like:

Metre
There is no doubt that the text is hexametrical, although there has been dispute about the scansion. One likely interpretation is thus:

Īntĕr "ĕ|īls" Gŏtĭ|cūm "scăpĭ|ā mătzĭ|ā iā | drīncăn!"
nōn āu|dēt quīs|quām dīg|nōs ē|dīcĕrĕ|vērsūs.
Cāllĭŏ|pē mădĭ|dō trĕpĭ|dāt sē | iūngĕrĕ | Bācchō.
nē pĕdĭ|būs nōn | stēt || ēbrĭă | Mūsă sŭ|īs.

References

East Germanic languages
Vandals
Gothic language
Medieval Latin poetry
Poems about drugs